Ammelide (6-amino-2,4-dihydroxy-1,3,5-triazine) is a triazine and the hydrolysis product of ammeline.

Synthesis
Ammelide can be obtained by heating dicyandiamide with aqueous ammonia at 160−170 °C. It can also be synthesized by heating melam with concentrated sulfuric acid for a short time at 190 °C.

Chemical property
Ammelide forms salts with both acids (hydrochloric acid, nitric acid, sulfuric acid) and bases (sodium hydroxide, ammonium, calcium hydroxide).

Ammelide decomposes at 170 °C with water to form carbon dioxide and ammonia.  It can be converted into cyanuric acid by oxidizing agents (e.g. potassium permanganate) or by boiling with acids or alkalis.

References
 B. Bann and S.A. Miller, "Melamines and derivatives of melamine", Chemical Reviews, vol.58, p131-172 (1958).

Triazines
Aromatic amines